George Ricardo D'Souza (born 30 April 1994) is an Indian professional footballer who plays as a left-back for FC Bengaluru United on loan from Odisha FC in the Indian Super League.

Early life and career 
D'Souza was born on 30 April 1994 in Goa. D'souza started his youth career from Sanquelim based academy, Sesa Football Academy in 2010.

Career

Sporting Clube de Goa 
D'Souza began his senior career by signing for the goan club Sporting Clube de Goa in 2016. He represented for the club in Goa Professional League. D'Souza made 20 appearances for the club and scored four goals and assisted three before leaving for Odisha FC.

Odisha FC 
On 3 June 2020, D'Souza signed for the Indian Super League club Odisha FC on a two-year contract. D'Souza made his debut for the club on 6 December 2020 against Mumbai City FC which they lost 2–0. He was included in starting eleven on his debut match. He played his second and last match of the season on 27 February 2021 in the all-time highest scoring game in the history of Indian Super League against SC East Bengal, where they won with a jaw dropping score of 6–5.

FC Bengaluru United (loan) 
On 12 July 2021, it was announced that D'Souza was loaned to I-League 2nd Division club FC Bengaluru United for the 2021–22 season.

Career statistics

References

External links 
 George D'Souza at Indian Super League
 

1995 births
Living people
Indian footballers
Association football defenders
Indian Super League players
Odisha FC players
Sporting Clube de Goa players
Footballers from Goa
Goa Professional League players
I-League 2nd Division players
FC Bengaluru United players